

Central bank
Central Bank of Armenia

Commercial banks
As of 31 December 2017, there are 17 commercial banks operating in Armenia. This includes:

Ameriabank opened in 1910 as the Yerevan branch of the Caucasus Trade Bank.
Armbusinessbank opened in 1994 as the legal successor of the "Arminvestbank" operating since 1991.
Byblos Bank Armenia opened in 2000 as the legal successor of the "International Trade Bank" operating since 1992.
Converse Bank, opened in 1993 as "North Armenian Shareholding Bank", incorporated into Converse Bank in 1997.
Evocabank opened in 1990 as Prometheus Bank, and renamed in 2001 as Prometey Bank. It was re-branded in 2017 as Evocabank.
HSBC Bank Armenia, opened in 1996 as "Midland Armenia Bank", incorporated into HSBC Bank Armenia in 1999.
VTB Armenia, opened in 1993 as the "ArmSavingsBank", incorporated into VTB Armenia in 2006.

Rankings 
Armenia-based commercial banks earned a total of 20.1 billion drams in net profit in the first quarter of 2018, up from 10.7 billion drams they had earned in the same period last year. The growth was 87.2%. All 17 banks closed the first quarter with a profit. The top five banks in terms of net profit growth were Artsakhbank, Ameriabank, Ardshinbank, Acba bank and Inecobank.

Ameriabank was leading by size of assets by the end of 2017. The top five largest banks in terms of assets were Ameriabank, Armbusinessbank, Ardshinbank, Acba bank and Inecobank, which accounted for 55.8% of all assets.

Out of 17 banks 15 were profitable in 2017. The top five banks by size of net profit were Ameriabank, Inecobank, Ardshinbank, Acba bank and IDBank. Ameriabank was the most profitable bank posting a total of 7.6 billion drams of net profit, an increase of 23.89% over the previous year.

According to data from first 3 quarters of 2017 the five leading banks in terms of mortgage portfolios are Ardshinbank, Converse Bank, Ameriabank, Araratbank and HSBC Bank Armenia, which account for 53.2% of the total mortgage lending.

Ratings 
Fitch Ratings’ bank sector outlook for Armenia in 2018 remains stable.

Development banks/representative offices
Below is a list of regional and international banks which have operations in Armenia:

Asian Development Bank, regional development bank representative office in Armenia opened in 2005. 
Interstate Bank, regional development bank representative office in Armenia opened in 1994.
Rosselkhozbank, special state agricultural bank of Russia representative office in Armenia opened in 2012.
Panarmenian Bank, enterprise development bank opened in 2008. Was reorganized into a fund in August 2018.
Armenia is a member of the European Bank for Reconstruction and Development, the EBRD maintains a representative office in Yerevan.
The Eurasian Development Bank maintains a representative office in Yerevan, Armenia is a full member.
The World Bank maintains a representative office in Yerevan, Armenia is a full member of the World Bank.
Armenia is a member of the International Monetary Fund, the IMF maintains a representative office in Yerevan.
The International Bank for Reconstruction and Development maintains a representative office in Yerevan.
Armenia is a founding member of the Black Sea Trade and Development Bank.
As of 2018, Armenia is a regional member of the Asian Infrastructure Investment Bank.

Former commercial banks
Armenian Development Bank, merged with Araratbank.
AreximBank-Gazprombank, acquired by Ardshinbank.
Cascade Bank, merged with Ameriabank.
BTA Bank, merged with ArmEconomBank.
ProCredit Bank, acquired by Inecobank.

See also

Armenia Securities Exchange
Central Depository of Armenia
Economy of Armenia
List of banks in Europe

References

External links
banks.am
www.armbanks.am by ARKA news agency

Armenia
Banks
Armenia
Armenia